Geraldo Dantas de Andrade (29 September 1931 – 1 May 2021) was a Brazilian Roman Catholic titular bishop and auxiliary bishop.

ãDantas de Andrade was born in Brazil and was ordained to the priesthood in 1957. He served as titular bishop of Cabalinia and was auxiliary bishop of the Roman Catholic Archdiocese of São Luís do Maranhão, Brazil, from 1998 to 2010.

Notes

1931 births
2021 deaths
Dehonian bishops
20th-century Roman Catholic bishops in Brazil
21st-century Roman Catholic bishops in Brazil
People from Rio de Janeiro (city)
Roman Catholic bishops of São Luís do Maranhão